Football Club Rieti, commonly known as FC Rieti or simply Rieti, was an Italian association football club, based in Rieti, Lazio. The club last competed in Serie D, the fourth tier of Italian football, playing home matches at the Stadio Centro d'Italia – Manlio Scopigno.

Formed in 1936, the team took the current name in 1996. Its main achievement has been the promotion to Serie B of Southern Italy in 1946.

History
The club was founded in 1936 as Supertessile Rieti and refounded in 1948 as S.S. Rieti and 1996 with the current name.

In the seasons 1946–47 and 1947–48 it played in Serie B South.

In the seasons 2005–06 and 2006–07 it played in Serie C2.

In May 2018, under the presidency of Riccardo Curci, the team was promoted to Serie C. Curci had been looking for buyers since then; at first Greek businessman Manthos Poulinakis bought the team, but some months later withdrew and sold it back to Curci.

After being relegated back to Serie D, Rieti started suffering a number of financial issues, which ultimately led to the club voluntarily withdrawing from the league in July 2022.

Colors and badge 

The team's colors are amaranth (Italian: amaranto) and sky blue (Italian: celeste).

Honours
 Regional Coppa Italia Lazio:
Winners 1: 2011–12

References

External links
 Official website

 
Football clubs in Lazio
Association football clubs established in 1936
Serie B clubs
Serie C clubs
Serie D clubs
Rieti
1936 establishments in Italy
Football clubs in Italy
Phoenix clubs (association football)